Asashio Tarō may refer to:

Asashio Tarō I (1864-1920), Japanese sumo wrestler; ozeki, real name Tarokichi Masuhara
Asashio Tarō II (1879-1961), Japanese sumo wrestler; ozeki and 3rd Takasago-oyakata, real name Chokichi Komota
Asashio Tarō III (1929-1988), Japanese sumo wrestler; 46th yokozuna and 5th Takasago-oyakata
Asashio Tarō IV (born 1955), Japanese sumo wrestler; ozeki and 7th Takasago-oyakata